Dobb may refer to:

Dobb (surname)
Dobb-e Hardan, a village in Khuzestan Province, Iran
Dobb-e Moleyhem, a village in Khuzestan Province, Iran
Dobb-e Said, a village in Khuzestan Province, Iran

See also

 
 Daub
 Dob (disambiguation)
 Dobbs (disambiguation)
 Dobby (disambiguation)
 Dobbie